Vladimir Alexeyevich Smirnov (in Russian: Владимир Алексеевич Смирнов, b. 1957 in Pskov) is a prominent Russian businessman, former Director General of the Petersburg Fuel Company (1997–1998), former Chairman of the Board of Directors of the Petersburg Fuel Company (1999–2001). In 2002–2007 he was the Director General of Tekhsnabexport (TENEX) which carries out export of goods and services produced by Russian nuclear enterprises.

Education
He graduated in 1980 from the Leningrad Institute of Aviation Instrument Production, where he majored in electromechanical engineering. Later he gained a PhD in Technical Sciences (1986) and in Economics (2000).

Smirnov is also the author of ten inventions and 45 scientific papers.  In 1988, he became the youngest Senior Researcher at the Leningrad Institute of Aviation Instrument Production. In 1988 he was awarded the State Science and Technology Prize for Young Researchers. The prize was donated to the Peace Foundation.

Early career
In 1990 he established one of Saint Petersburg's first joint ventures (with German partners), the real estate development company Inform-Future, which built the city's first office centre for foreign companies.

St. Petersburg Immobilien und Beteiligungs AG or SPAG is a real estate company registered in Germany under Vladimir Putin's control in 1992 and suspected by German police of facilitating Saint Petersburg mobsters, Colombian drug lords, and transcontinental money laundering. Kumarin-Barsukov, of the Tambov Russian mafia was a partner in Znamenskaya, a subsidiary of SPAG. Vladimir Smirmov was the general director of Znamenskaya and Kumarin-Barsukov was his deputy. Through his 200 shares or 20% control, Vladimir Smirmov was Putin's voting proxy in SPAG. Jalol Khaidarov stated that the final destination of the funds was to the "Operator Trade Center" in Liechtenstein but also said that the Bank of New York was a participant. In the early 2000s, the company's co-founder Rudolf Ritter was arrested in Liechtenstein for laundering cocaine cash for the Cali cartel. Robert Walner was the chief prosecutor in Liechtenstein's capital Vaduz.

Not long after Vladimir Putin returned from his KGB service in Dresden, East Germany he had built a dacha in Solovyovka, located on the eastern shore of Lake Komsomolskoye on the Karelian Isthmus in Priozersky District of Leningrad Oblast, near St. Petersburg. The dacha had burned down in 1996. Putin had a new one built identical to the original and was joined by a group of seven friends, who built dachas beside his. Vladimir Smirnov was one of the members of the group which in the fall of 1996 formally registered their fraternity as co-operative society, calling it Ozero (Lake) and turning it into a gated community.

Smirnov was also the Chief Executive Officer of the Petersburg Fuel Company between 1997 and 1998 and the company's Chairman of the Board of Directors between 1999 and 2000.

Since 2008 he has been a member of the Board of Directors of Natsionalny Kosmicheski Bank, one of the top 200 banks out of 1000 operating in Russia.

Tenex
Between 2002 and 2007 Vladimir Smirnov was General Director of Tekhsnabexport (Tenex) which carries out the export of goods and services produced by Russian nuclear enterprises. Tenex represents 35-50% of the nuclear world market. During this period, Tenex also signed long term contracts until 2020 on the system of guaranteed supplies of low-enriched uranium for almost all of the world's nuclear power plants.

In 2003, the highly enriched Uranium program "megatons to megawatts" in cooperation with the United States, was run by Tenex, while Smirnov was the General Director. The program enabled Russia to earn USD 3.5 billion since its inception in 1994.

In 2005, Smirnov was appointed as an external advisor to the head of the Federal Atomic Agency, Rosatom. At this time, he presided over the grand opening of the Tenex Subsidiary Office in Tokyo. According to Smirnov, the cooperation between Japan and Russia is a milestone for the world's atomic energy future.

Since 2003, JSC Techsnabexport (Tenex), has been the general sponsor of the annual Russian contest of scientific and educational projects “Power of the Future.” The contest, organized by the Nuclear Academy, aims to improve the efficiency of education and to upgrade the intellectual potential in the nuclear industry.

In addition, a sponsorship program for nuclear disarmament, non-proliferation, and environment protection activities of Russian and foreign social organizations was established at Tenex between 2002 and 2007, upon the initiative of Vladimir Smirnov. Tenex notably  sponsored the Peace Concert which took place in Zug, Switzerland, on 13 October 2002, with the participation of the ensemble led by V. Spivakov. The event was attended by Nobel Peace Prize laureates, ex-President of the USSR Mikhail Gorbachev and Archbishop of Cape Town Desmond Tutu, distinguished European Community leaders and peace movement leaders from various countries.

Notes

References

External links
Interview with Vladimir Smirnov (in Russian)
TENEX
Ground Report.
Wikinews (in German)

1957 births
Living people
Businesspeople from Saint Petersburg